Robert J. "Rob" Anders (born April 1, 1972) is a Canadian former politician. He represented the riding of Calgary West from 1997 until 2015 and was a founding member of the Conservative Party of Canada.

On April 12, 2014, Anders was defeated by former provincial minister Ron Liepert for the Conservative nomination in Calgary Signal Hill, which included the bulk of his former riding, for the next federal election.

On September 20, 2014, Anders was defeated for a second time in an attempt to gain the nomination in Bow River by Brooks mayor Martin Shields.

Early life
Anders was born in Winnipeg, Manitoba. He graduated from the University of Calgary with a bachelor of arts degree in political science. At the time of his first election in 1997 he served as the director of Canadians Against Forced Unionism, an organization related to the National Citizens Coalition.

Parliamentary career
Anders was first elected as the Reform Party MP for Calgary West in 1997, at age 25. The seat had been vacated when the former MP for the riding, Stephen Harper, resigned in 1996. It was expected that Anders would run in a by-election, but the 1997 election was called earlier than expected.

Bills introduced
In March 2003 Anders introduced Bill C-414 as a private members' bill. It was entitled "An Act to amend the Special Economic Measures Act (no foreign aid to countries that do not respect religious freedom)." The purpose of the bill was to stop Canadian government from spending the foreign aid budget in countries that did not allow for religious freedom.

Anders introduced Bill C-570 on January 29, 2014, which would amend the criminal code to provide for mandatory minimum sentences for rape.

36th Parliament (1997–2000)
Anders was elected as a member of the Reform Party (1997–2000) and converted to the Canadian Alliance in 2000.

Anders served in several different critic roles in opposition. First as critic of the Senate from June 16, 1998 to 1999 as well as associate critic for Human Resource Development from his first election to July 31, 2000. In August 2000 he was appointed associate critic for Citizenship and Immigration.

Along with fellow newly elected MPs Jason Kenney, Monte Solberg, Rahim Jaffer and advisor Ezra Levant, Anders was part of an up-and-coming group of young Reformers which pundits dubbed the "Snack Pack" due to their relative youth - all aged under 30; and girth.

37th Parliament (2001–2004)
On June 18, 2001 he became associate critic for National Defence, until appointed critic for Civil Preparedness from Jan 22, 2004 until the 2004 election.

Over time Anders has served in several leadership roles on parliamentary committees. In the 37th Canadian Parliament he was the vice-chair of the Subcommittee on National Security of the Standing Committee on Justice, Human Rights, Public Safety and Emergency Preparedness.

Anders was the sole parliamentarian to vote against making Nelson Mandela an honorary citizen of Canada in 2001, which prevented the act from passing unanimously. He defended his actions by stating that Mandela was a communist and a terrorist, causing widespread criticism. As a result, during the next two federal elections, Anders was the target of a mostly unsuccessful non-partisan "Vote Out Rob Anders" campaign in his riding, but his popular vote percentage increased in every federal election since he was first elected in the 1997 Canadian federal election.

Anders was a supporter of Stephen Harper's successful 2002 bid for the leadership of the Canadian Alliance, providing significant assistance with the campaign's phone-banking.

38th Parliament (2004–2005)
In the next parliament Anders became the co-chair of the Scrutiny of Regulations Committee.

In December 2005, Anders used public funds to send pamphlets to residents in Richmond, British Columbia, a constituency far removed from his own. The leaflets caused bewilderment for including a survey question about "homosexual sex marriage" in a flyer otherwise addressing crime and crystal meth abuse.

39th Parliament (2006–2008)
In the 39th Canadian Parliament, after the Conservatives came to power, he was elected chair of the Standing Committee on Veterans Affairs.

40th Parliament (2008–2011)
In the 40th Canadian Parliament he had three different committee leadership jobs: vice-chair of the Government Operations and Estimates Committee, vice-chair of Subcommittee on Agenda and Procedure of the Standing Committee on Government Operations and Estimates and co-chair of Library of Parliament Committee.

Anders has been a consistent critic of the human rights record of the People's Republic of China. He has described the PRC as "the worst human-rights abuser in the world," and compared the 2008 Beijing Olympics to the 1936 Berlin Olympics. He argued that "China is the wrong choice to host the Games... I absolutely 100% think it compares to the Berlin Olympics in 1936." Anders highlights that the fact that Falun Gong practitioners are not allowed to participate in the Olympics is comparable with Adolf Hitler's issue with Jewish participation in the 1936 Berlin Olympics." Anders has also said that no Canadian politician should attend the games, nor should any Canadian athletes be used as "propaganda tools." His comments were criticized by local Chinese trade association as well as fellow Calgary Tory MP Deepak Obhrai, who disclaimed Anders "was speaking as an individual and his comments are not reflective of government policy."

In February 2010, nineteen members of Anders' Calgary West riding association resigned en masse, citing interference from the Conservative Party. The 32 member board had been planning to ask Conservative Party members at the riding's upcoming annual general meeting whether they wanted to hold a nomination contest. The party's national council intervened, saying it had already declared Anders as the candidate for the next federal election, and threatened to take control of the annual general meeting of the constituency association. The resignations brought the total number of board members who had resigned over the course of one year to twenty-four.

In 2010, in a card supporting Canadian troops, Anders wrote: "When in doubt, pull the trigger".

41st Parliament (2011–2015)
After the 2011 Canadian election, Anders served as a member of the Veterans Affairs Committee, the Industry, Science and Technology Committee and the Committee for the Scrutiny of Regulations.

He was removed from his position on Veterans Affairs, partly based on his tendency to fall asleep during meetings. He was reassigned to the House–Senate Standing Joint Committee on Scrutiny of Regulations. In 2011 Anders began to lobby for the government to stop funding the CBC.

Anders' decision to become involved in the newly formed Wildrose Alliance Party of Alberta has generated controversy, as the Wildrose Alliance Party had hoped to defeat the ruling Progressive Conservative Party of Alberta in the province's 2012 election. Ron Liepert, Alberta's Minister of Energy, accused Anders of campaigning against him.

In March 2012, Anders was removed from the Veterans Affairs Committee following controversial comments in response to arriving late, texting, and falling asleep at a committee meeting (including calling his accusers NDP "hacks", and claiming that they praise Vladimir Putin).

In July 2012, Anders opposed his own party and criticized Treasury Board President Tony Clement for funding a visitors' centre honouring to Norman Bethune, a Canadian physician who died while performing emergency medicine for the Chinese resistance against the Japanese occupation of China. According to Anders, "You don't need taxpayer money to go ahead and memorialize somebody who was a fan of the biggest killer in human history [Mao Zedong]", referring to Bethune's communist ideals although Bethune had died ten years before Mao took power.

In September and October 2012, fellow Conservative Party members disassociated themselves from Anders' belief that New Democratic Party leader Thomas Mulcair "hastened the death" of former NDP leader Jack Layton by encouraging an election while being in questionable health.

In October 2012, Anders attracted some controversy by calling Bill C279, a private member's bill that would amend the Canadian Human Rights Act and hate crime section of the Criminal Code to include "gender identity" and "gender expression" as grounds for discrimination, a "bathroom bill".

On December 6, 2013, Anders spoke out after the death of Nelson Mandela, saying "If you are looking for another perspective you may be interested in the obituary that David Horowitz wrote for the Freedom Center".

Prime Minister Stephen Harper has indicated his support of Anders, stating that "Rob is a true reformer and a true conservative. He has been a faithful supporter of mine and I am grateful for his work."

Nomination challenges
Before the nomination race he ultimately lost, Anders defeated several high-profile challengers for the local Conservative nomination.

In 1997, despite his relative youthfulness, Anders was already a veteran political organizer, and was able to win a hotly contested nomination in one of the safest Reform ridings in Canada.

In 2000 he defeated MLA Jocelyn Burgener for the Canadian Alliance nomination. Before the 2004 federal election Anders was challenged by future Alberta Premier Allison Redford. Redford's campaign was run by Ron Liepert, who would later challenge Anders for the new Calgary Signal Hill constituency.

In 2007 Anders was re-nominated by the Conservative party without a challenger. This led to a court challenge, which initially rescinded the decision and called for a new nomination. This decision was overturned on appeal, and Anders was the candidate in the 2008 Canadian Federal Election.

In 2010 Anders was challenged again, but successfully defeated Donna Kennedy-Glans, who was elected an MLA in 2012.

Ahead of the 42nd general election, Anders ran for the Conservative nomination in Calgary Signal Hill, essentially a reconfigured version of Calgary West. However, he was defeated by former provincial cabinet minister Ron Liepert. Anders had characterized the nomination contest as a fight for the party's soul. He was rebuked by the party for making misleading phone calls that left the impression they were coming from Liepert's campaign.

After losing the nomination race for Calgary Signal Hill, Anders decided to contest for the nomination in the new electoral district of Bow River, a mostly rural riding east of Calgary. Anders moved into the district in order to present himself as a resident of the district but he faced a challenge from the mayor of the City of Brooks, Martin Shields; former Rocky View County reeve Rolly Ashdown; and an economics professor from Calgary's Mount Royal University, Gerard Lucyshyn. All have been long-time residents of the district.

On September 20, 2014, Anders lost the nomination for Bow River to Shields. His entry in the race for Bow River caused resentment amongst the other candidates who felt that Anders had parachuted into the riding after losing the nomination race in Calgary Signal Hill.

Post-parliamentary life
Anders serves as president of Firearms Institute for Rational Education. In 2016, he traveled to Arizona to support the campaign to elect Donald Trump as President of the United States.

Provincial politics
At the provincial level, Anders is a member of the Wildrose Party in Alberta and publicly renewed his membership in the wake of the December 2014 defection of 9 of its MLAs, including party leader Danielle Smith, to the governing Progressive Conservatives. Anders expressed interest in running in the Wildrose party's leadership election to choose a successor to Smith after she crossed the floor to join the ruling Progressive Conservatives, however, on January 23, 2015, the Wildrose executive announced that Anders was not qualified to run as he did not meet the minimum 6 month membership requirement and that the party would not be issuing a waiver to permit him to be a candidate.

Alleged tax evasion
In 2020, the National Post reported that Anders had been charged by the Canada Revenue Agency for tax evasion. Most of the five charges that were laid dated to the period of 1997 to 2015, when he was a member of parliament. Anders was scheduled to face trial on tax evasion charges on October 25, 2021. On June 6, 2022 the CBC reported that all tax evasion charges against Rob Anders had been stayed.

Electoral record
Anders has faced high-profile opponents. In 1997 he defeated Dave Bronconnier, who later became the Mayor of Calgary. In 2000 he defeated Jim Silye, a former Reform MP who was now running for the PCs.

Activism
Anders has devoted his time to a variety of conservative causes. Some of these include lobby groups and think tanks such as Focus on the Family, the Canada Family Action Coalition, and to several causes opposing the Government of China's policies regarding Tibet and Falun Gong. Before being elected he worked for the Republican Party on the 1994 Senate campaign of Jim Inhofe in Oklahoma as a professional heckler, which earned him the label of "a foreign political saboteur" from CNN.

References

External links
Official website

1972 births
Canadian Alliance MPs
Conservative Party of Canada MPs
Living people
Members of the House of Commons of Canada from Alberta
Politicians from Calgary
Politicians from Winnipeg
Reform Party of Canada MPs
University of Calgary alumni
20th-century Canadian politicians
21st-century Canadian politicians